Brigadier General William Kinsey Bolton  (2 November 1861 – 8 September 1941) was an Australian soldier, politician and a founding member of the Returned Sailors and Soldiers Imperial League of Australia (RSSILA), forerunner of the present Returned and Services League of Australia. Bolton commanded the 8th Battalion early on in the First World War, including during the landing and initial battles of the Gallipoli campaign. Bolton's Ridge on the right flank of Anzac Cove was named after him. He returned to Australia due to ill health in September 1915, was elected the inaugural National President of the RSSILA (1916–19), and served as a Nationalist Senator from Victoria from 1917 to 1923.

Sources
Lieutenant Colonel William Kinsey Bolton, CBE, VD
Australian War Memorial
The 2nd Brigade, awm.gov.au. Accessed 1 October 2022.  
Official Histories, awm.gov.au. Accessed 1 October 2022.

1861 births
1941 deaths
Military personnel from Cheshire
Australian generals
Australian military personnel of World War I
Deaths from cancer in Victoria (Australia)
Commanders of the Order of the British Empire
English emigrants to colonial Australia
Members of the Australian Senate for Victoria
Nationalist Party of Australia members of the Parliament of Australia
20th-century Australian politicians